

Days of the month

31 July 2008 (Thursday)
 Baseball:
 Trade deadline deals:
 Manny Ramírez, increasingly alienated from his previous team, the Boston Red Sox, is sent to the Los Angeles Dodgers in a three-way deal. The Bosox receive Jason Bay from the Pittsburgh Pirates, who in turn receive four minor-leaguers, two from the Sox and two from the Dodgers. The Sox will also pay the remaining US$7 million of Ramírez' salary.
 Ken Griffey Jr. goes from his hometown Cincinnati Reds to the Chicago White Sox for two players.
 The New York Yankees acquire catcher Iván Rodríguez from the Detroit Tigers for relief pitcher Kyle Farnsworth. (The Windsor Star)

30 July 2008 (Wednesday)

29 July 2008 (Tuesday)
 American football:
 Former Green Bay Packers quarterback and Brett Favre, who had announced his retirement after the 2008 season, faxes a letter seeking reinstatement to the NFL.
Baseball:
 Seattle Mariners center fielder Ichiro Suzuki becomes the youngest player ever to amass 3,000 hits in his top-level professional career, reaching the milestone with a single on the first pitch he saw in the first inning of the Mariners' game against the Texas Rangers. The hit gave Ichiro 1,722 Major League Baseball hits to go with the 1,278 he amassed during his nine-year career with the Orix BlueWave in Japan.

28 July 2008 (Monday)

27 July 2008 (Sunday)

Cycling:
Tour de France – Stage 21 (Étampes > Paris Champs-Élysées):
(1)  Gert Steegmans (2)  Gerald Ciolek (3)  Óscar Freire
 Carlos Sastre  wins the Tour de France, becoming the third successive Spanish rider to win the race, and the seventh in the history of the Tour. Cadel Evans  is 58 seconds later in the General classification, taking second place for the second year in succession. Bernhard Kohl   finishes in 3rd place.
 Óscar Freire wins the points (green jersey) competition.
 Bernhard Kohl wins the King of the Mountain (polka dot jersey) competition, 48 points clear of Sastre.
 Andy Schleck  wins the youth (white jersey) competition. www.letour.fr
Auto racing:
Sprint Cup:
Allstate 400 at the Brickyard in Speedway, Indiana
(1) Jimmie Johnson  (2) Carl Edwards  (3) Denny Hamlin 
World Touring Car Championship season: Brands Hatch at Kent, United Kingdom
Race 1: (1) Jörg Müller  (2) Yvan Müller  (3) Andy Priaulx 
Race 2: (1) Alain Menu  (2) Félix Porteiro  (3) Alex Zanardi 
Deutsche Tourenwagen Masters: Round 7 at Nürburgring, Germany
(1) Bernd Schneider  (2) Paul di Resta  (3) Jamie Green 
Golf:
PGA Tour:
RBC Canadian Open in Oakville, Ontario
 PGA Tour rookie Chez Reavie  becomes the eighth golfer this season to win his first career PGA Tour event, cruising to a three-shot win over Billy Mayfair .
European Tour:
Inteco Russian Open in Russia:
 (1) Mikael Lundberg 
LPGA Tour:
Evian Masters in Evian-les-Bains, France:
 Helen Alfredsson  wins her first LPGA event since 2003 in a sudden-death playoff, eliminating Angela Park  on the first extra hole and besting Na Yeon Choi  on the third extra hole.
Tennis:
ATP Tour:
Canada Masters in Toronto, Ontario, Canada:
Rafael Nadal  beat Nicolas Kiefer  6–3, 6–2
WTA Tour:
East West Bank Classic in Carson, California, United States:
Dinara Safina  beat Flavia Pennetta  6–4, 6–2
Banka Koper Slovenia Open in Portorož, Slovenia:
Sara Errani  beat Anabel Medina Garrigues  6–3, 6–3
Beach soccer:
FIFA World Cup in Marseille, France:
Final: Brazil  5–3  Italy.
Brazil beat Italy in the Plage du Prado to win the World Cup for the third time in a row. This was the first occasion that the FIFA Beach Soccer World Cup has been held outside of Brazil.

26 July 2008 (Saturday)

Auto racing:
IRL:
Rexall Edmonton Indy in Edmonton, Alberta, Canada
(1) Scott Dixon  (2) Hélio Castroneves  (3) Justin Wilson 
Cricket
India in Sri Lanka:
1st Test in Colombo:  600/6d (162 ov) beat  223 (72.5 ov) & 138 (45 ov) by an innings and 239 runs.
Cycling:
Tour de France – Stage 20 (Cérilly > Saint-Amand-Montrond) (Time trial):
(1)  Stefan Schumacher (2)  Fabian Cancellara (3)  Kim Kirchen
 Cadel Evans  makes up 29 seconds on Carlos Sastre  to take second place in the General classification, but remains 1'05" behind Sastre, who seems likely to win the race in Paris tomorrow.
Rugby union:
Tri Nations Series:
 34–19  at Sydney
 In the Bledisloe Cup opener, the Wallabies score a decisive win over the All Blacks to take pole position in the series.

25 July 2008 (Friday)
Cycling:
Tour de France – Stage 19 (Roanne > Montluçon):
(1)  Sylvain Chavanel (2)  Jérémy Roy (3)  Gerald Ciolek
 The top ten positions in the General classification remain unchanged.

24 July 2008 (Thursday)

Cycling:
Tour de France – Stage 18 (Le Bourg-d'Oisans > Saint-Étienne):
(1)  Marcus Burghardt (2)  Carlos Barredo (3)  Romain Feillu
 All the leaders finish together in the peloton, so Carlos Sastre  maintains his 1'24" lead in the general classification.

23 July 2008 (Wednesday)
Cycling:
Tour de France – Stage 17 (Embrun > Alpe d'Huez):
(1)  Carlos Sastre (2)  Samuel Sánchez (3)  Andy Schleck
 Sastre takes the yellow jersey with a 1'24" lead over Fränk Schleck .

22 July 2008 (Tuesday)

Cycling:
Tour de France – Stage 16 (Cuneo  > Jausiers):
(1)  Cyril Dessel (2)  Sandy Casar (3)  David Arroyo
 Fränk Schleck  still holds the yellow jersey.

21 July 2008 (Monday)

American football
The New York Giants trade tight end Jeremy Shockey to the New Orleans Saints for two draft picks. (AP via Yahoo)
Cricket
South Africa in England:
2nd Test at Headingley, Leeds:  522 (176.2 ov) & 9/0 (1.1 ov) beat  203 (52.3 ov) & 327 (107 ov) by 10 wickets.
South Africa lead 4-match series 1–0

20 July 2008 (Sunday)

American football:
The Miami Dolphins trade six-time Pro Bowl defensive end Jason Taylor to the Washington Redskins for two draft picks (NFL.com)
Auto racing:
Formula One:
German Grand Prix in Hockenheim, Germany:
(1) Lewis Hamilton  (2) Nelson Piquet Jr.  (3) Felipe Massa 
IRL:
Honda 200 at Mid-Ohio Sports Car Course in Lexington, Ohio:
(1) Ryan Briscoe  (2) Dan Wheldon  (3) Hélio Castroneves 
V8 Supercar:
City of Ipswich 400 at Queensland Raceway in Ipswich, Queensland, Australia
(1) Mark Winterbottom  (2) Russell Ingall  (3) James Courtney 
Basketball:
World Olympic Qualifying Tournament for Men in Athens, Greece – 3rd place playoff:
 96–82 
Germany qualifies for the Olympic tournament for the first time since 1992.
Cycling:
Tour de France – Stage 15 (Embrun > Prato Nevoso ):
(1)  Simon Gerrans (2)  Egoi Martínez (3)  Danny Pate
 Fränk Schleck  takes the yellow jersey as the Tour enters Italy, with a seven-second lead over Bernhard Kohl  and eight seconds over Cadel Evans .
 Four-stage winner Mark Cavendish  withdraws before the start of the stage, citing fatigue and the need to prepare for the Beijing Olympics, while 2006 Tour de France winner Óscar Pereiro , crashes out of the race with a fractured shoulder on the descent from Col Agnel.
Golf:
PGA Tour and European Tour:
The Open Championship in Southport, England
 Defending champion Pádraig Harrington  shakes off a wrist injury to shoot a 1-under par 69 to finish at 283 (+3), giving him a four-stroke victory over Ian Poulter  and becoming the first European to win consecutive Opens since James Braid in 1905 and 1906. Third-round leader Greg Norman , attempting to become the oldest player ever to win a major, shoots 7-over 77 and finishes in a tie for third, six shots behind Harrington.
PGA Tour:
U.S. Bank Championship in Milwaukee in Brown Deer, Wisconsin
 Richard S. Johnson  becomes the seventh golfer to record his first career PGA Tour win this season, winning by one shot over Ken Duke .
LPGA Tour:
State Farm Classic in Springfield, Illinois
 Ji Young Oh  wins her first career LPGA event, defeating Yani Tseng  on the first hole of a sudden-death playoff.
Motorcycle racing:
Moto GP:
United States motorcycle Grand Prix at Mazda Raceway Laguna Seca, Monterey, California, United States:
(1) Valentino Rossi  (2) Casey Stoner  (3) Chris Vermeulen 
Superbike:
Brno Superbike World Championship round at Masaryk Circuit, Brno, Czech Republic:
Race 1 (1) Troy Bayliss  (2) Troy Corser  (3) Michel Fabrizio 
Race 2 (1) Troy Bayliss  (2) Michel Fabrizio  (3) Max Biaggi 
Tennis:
ATP Tour:
Priority Telecom Open in Amersfoort, Netherlands:
Final: Albert Montañés  beat Steve Darcis  1–6, 7–5, 6–3
Indianapolis Tennis Championships in Indianapolis, United States:
Final: Gilles Simon  beat Dmitry Tursunov  6–4, 6–4
Austrian Open in Kitzbühel, Austria:
Final: Juan Martín del Potro  beat Jürgen Melzer  6–2, 6–1
Croatia Open Umag in Umag, Croatia:
Final: Fernando Verdasco  beat Igor Andreev 3–6, 6–4, 7–6(4)
WTA Tour:
Bank of the West Classic in Stanford, United States:
Final: Aleksandra Wozniak  beat Marion Bartoli  7–5, 6–3
Gastein Ladies in Bad Gastein, Austria:
Final: Pauline Parmentier  beat Lucie Hradecká  6–4, 6–4

19 July 2008 (Saturday)

Basketball:
World Olympic Qualifying Tournament for Men in Athens, Greece – Semifinals:
 88–63 
 76–70 
Greece and Croatia qualify to the Olympic tournament. Puerto Rico and Germany will contest the last qualifying spot on Sunday.
Cycling:
Tour de France – Stage 14 (Nîmes > Digne-les-Bains):
(1)  Óscar Freire (2)  Leonardo Duque (3)  Erik Zabel
Cadel Evans  retains his slender advantage of one second over Fränk Schleck  as the race enters the Alps tomorrow.
Rugby union:
Tri Nations Series:
 16–9  in Perth

18 July 2008 (Friday)

Basketball:
World Olympic Qualifying Tournament for Men in Athens, Greece – Quarterfinals:
 75–48 
 78–65 
 81–70 
 83–62 
Cycling:
Tour de France – Stage 13 (Narbonne > Nîmes):
(1)  Mark Cavendish  (2)  Robbie McEwen  (3)  Romain Feillu 
Cavendish wins his fourth stage of this Tour. Cadel Evans  retains the yellow jersey.

17 July 2008 (Thursday)

Cycling:
Tour de France – Stage 12 (Lavelanet > Narbonne):
(1)  Mark Cavendish  (2)  Sébastien Chavanel  (3)  Gert Steegmans 
Mark Cavendish becomes the first British cyclist ever to win three stages of the same Tour de France.
Cadel Evans  continues to wear the yellow jersey.
Following the expulsion of Riccardo Riccò from the race after he tested positive for EPO, his Saunier Duval–Scott team withdraws from the Tour before the start of Stage 12.

16 July 2008 (Wednesday)

Cycling:
Tour de France – Stage 11 (Lannemezan > Foix):
(1) Kurt Asle Arvesen  (2) Martin Elmiger  (3) Alessandro Ballan 
Cadel Evans  retains the yellow jersey.
Basketball:
World Olympic Qualifying Tournament for Men in Athens, Greece:
Group A:  89–69 
Group B:  89–71 
Group C:  79–77 
Canada overturns 12-pts deficit in the last 3 minutes to secure its place in the quarter-finals.
Group D:  95–81

15 July 2008 (Tuesday)

Baseball:
MLB All-Star Game at Yankee Stadium in Bronx, New York:
American League 4, National League 3, 15 innings.
A base hit by Texas' Michael Young ends the longest All-Star Game in time (4 hours and 50 minutes) and tied for longest game innings played (with the 1967 game in Anaheim, California) and gives the AL home field advantage for the sixth straight year in the 2008 World Series.
Basketball:
World Olympic Qualifying Tournament for Men in Athens, Greece
Group A:  94 – 54 
Group B:  104 – 68 
Group C:  86 – 70 
Group D:  81 – 72 
Greece, Brazil, Germany, New Zealand, Slovenia, Croatia and Puerto Rico qualify to the quarterfinals. The last spot will be contested on Wednesday between Canada and Korea.

14 July 2008 (Monday)

Cycling:
Tour de France – Stage 10 (Pau > Hautacam):
(1)  Leonardo Piepoli  (2)  Juan José Cobo  (3)  Fränk Schleck 
Cadel Evans  takes the yellow jersey, with one second lead over Schleck.
Cricket:
South Africa in England:
1st Test at Lord's, London:  593/8dec (156.2 ov) drew   247 (93.3 ov) & 393/3dec (167 ov).
Basketball:
World Olympic Qualifying Tournament for Men in Athens, Greece
Group A:  119–62 
Group B:  77–50 
Group C:  88–76 
Group D:  93–79

13 July 2008 (Sunday)

Auto racing:
World Touring Car Championship season: Autódromo do Estoril at Estoril, Portugal
Race 1: (1) Rickard Rydell  (2) Nicola Larini  (3) Yvan Muller 
Race 2: (1) Tiago Monteiro  (2) Yvan Muller  (3) Andy Priaulx 
Deutsche Tourenwagen Masters: Round 6 at Zandvoort, Netherlands
(1) Mattias Ekström  (2) Timo Scheider  (3) Tom Kristensen 
Cycling:
Tour de France – Stage 9 (Toulouse > Bagnères-de-Bigorre):
(1) Riccardo Riccò  (2) Vladimir Efimkin  (3) Cyril Dessel 
Kim Kirchen  continues to wear the yellow jersey.
Motorcycle racing:
Moto GP:
German motorcycle Grand Prix at Sachsenring, Hohenstein-Ernstthal, Germany:
(1) Casey Stoner  (2) Valentino Rossi  (3) Chris Vermeulen

12 July 2008 (Saturday)

Auto racing:
Sprint Cup:
LifeLock.com 400 in Joliet, Illinois
(1) Kyle Busch  (2) Jimmie Johnson  (3) Kevin Harvick 
IRL:
Firestone Indy 200 in Lebanon, Tennessee
(1) Scott Dixon  (2) Dan Wheldon  (3) Hélio Castroneves 
Cycling:
Tour de France – Stage 8 (Figeac > Toulouse):
(1)  Mark Cavendish  (2)  Gerald Ciolek  (3)  Jimmy Casper 
 The last stage before the Tour enters the Pyrenees ends in a mass sprint, with Kim Kirchen  retaining the yellow jersey.
Rugby union:
Tri Nations Series:
 (15) 28 – (17) 30  in Dunedin
 The Springboks defeat the All Blacks two tries to one to break a historic 30 match-unbeaten home record for the All Blacks. It marks the Boks' first win in New Zealand in ten years, and will also return the rugby world champions to the top spot in the IRB World Rankings, which they had lost to the All Blacks last week.

11 July 2008 (Friday)

Cycling:
Tour de France – Stage 7 (Brioude > Aurillac):
(1)  Luis León Sánchez  (2)  Stefan Schumacher  (3)  Filippo Pozzato
Kim Kirchen  retains the yellow jersey.
At stage's end, news broke of a failed drugs test by Spanish rider Manuel Beltrán. He was ejected from the tour.

10 July 2008 (Thursday)

Cycling:
Tour de France – Stage 6 (Aigurande > Super-Besse Sancy):
(1) Riccardo Riccò  (2) Alejandro Valverde  (3) Cadel Evans 
 The first mountain stage of the Tour, an intermediate climbing stage in the Massif Central, sees Kim Kirchen  take over the yellow jersey as leader of the general classification after previous race leader Stefan Schumacher  crashes near the finish.

9 July 2008 (Wednesday)
Cycling:
Tour de France – Stage 5 (Cholet > Châteauroux):
(1) Mark Cavendish  (2) Óscar Freire  (3) Erik Zabel

8 July 2008 (Tuesday)
Cycling:
Tour de France – Stage 4, ITT (Cholet):
(1) Stefan Schumacher  (2) Kim Kirchen  (3) David Millar 
 The first time trial of the Tour causes the expected shakeup in the general classification, with the top five finishers in the stage taking over the top five places, in the same order, in the GC. Schumacher becomes the third different rider in four days to don the yellow jersey.

7 July 2008 (Monday)
Basketball:
Former Los Angeles Clippers swingman and free agent Corey Maggette signs with the Golden State Warriors.
Cycling:
Tour de France – Stage 3 (St-Malo > Nantes):
(1) Samuel Dumoulin  (2) William Frischkorn  (3) Romain Feillu

6 July 2008 (Sunday)

Auto racing:
Formula One:
British Grand Prix, at Silverstone Circuit, Northamptonshire, Great Britain:
(1) Lewis Hamilton  (2) Nick Heidfeld  (3) Rubens Barrichello 
FIA GT Championship:
Oschersleben 2 Hours, at Motorsport Arena Oschersleben, Oschersleben, Germany:
(1) Karl Wendlinger  & Ryan Sharp  (2) Lukas Lichtner-Hoyer  & Alex Müller  (3) Jean-Denis Délétraz  & Marcel Fässler 
IRL:
Camping World Watkins Glen Grand Prix, at Watkins Glen International, Watkins Glen, New York
(1) Ryan Hunter-Reay  (2) Darren Manning  (3) Tony Kanaan 
V8 Supercar:
Skycity Triple Crown, at Hidden Valley Raceway, Darwin, Australia:
(1) Steven Richards  (2) Mark Winterbottom  (3) Garth Tander 
Baseball:
The Cleveland Indians trade three-time All-Star pitcher CC Sabathia to the Milwaukee Brewers for four minor leaguers. (Yahoo Sports)
Seven players from the Chicago Cubs and Boston Red Sox are named to the rosters for next week's 2008 Major League Baseball All-Star Game.
Cricket:
Asia Cup – Final:
 273 (49.5 ov) beat  173 (39.3 ov) by 100 runs
Australia in the West Indies:
5th ODI at Basseterre:  341/8 (50 ov) beat  172 (39.5 ov) by 169 runs
 win the series 5–0
Cycling:
Tour de France – Stage 2 (Auray > Saint-Brieuc):
(1) Thor Hushovd  (2) Kim Kirchen  (3) Gerald Ciolek 
Tennis:
2008 Wimbledon Championships – Gentlemen's Singles Final:
 Rafael Nadal def.  Roger Federer 6–4, 6–4, 6–7(5), 6–7(8), 9–7

5 July 2008 (Saturday)

Auto racing:
NASCAR Sprint Cup:
Coke Zero 400 in Daytona Beach, Florida:
(1) Kyle Busch  (2) Carl Edwards  (3) Matt Kenseth 

Cycling:
Tour de France – Stage 1 (Brest > Plumelec):
(1) Alejandro Valverde  (2) Philippe Gilbert  (3) Jérôme Pineau 
2008 European Road Championships:
Women's U23 road race  Rasa Leleivytė ,  Lesya Kalytovska ,  Marta Bastianelli 
Men's U23 road race:  Cyril Gautier ,  Paul Voss   Timofey Kritskiy 
Mixed martial arts:
UFC 86 in Las Vegas:
Rugby union:
Tri Nations Series:
 19–8  at Wellington
Mid-year Tests:
 40–10  at Brisbane
Tennis:
2008 Wimbledon Championships – Ladies' Singles Final:
 Venus Williams def.  Serena Williams 7–5, 6–4

4 July 2008 (Friday)

Cricket:
Australia in the West Indies:
4th ODI at Basseterre:  282/8 (50 overs) beat  281/6 (50 overs) by 1 run.
 lead 5-match series 4–0.
Asia Cup – Super Fours:
 116/0 (19.4 overs) beat  115/10 (38.2 overs) by 10 wickets (with 182 balls remaining).
India and Sri Lanka reach the final

3 July 2008 (Thursday)

Cycling:
2008 European Road Championships:
Women's U23 time trial  Ellen van Dijk ,  Svitlana Halyuk ,  Lesya Kalytovska 
Men's U23 time trial:  Adriano Malori ,  Timofey Kritskiy ,  Artem Ovechkin 
Cricket:
Asia Cup – Super Fours:
 310/4 (46.5 ov) beat  308/8 (50 ov) by 6 wickets
 qualify for the finals
Tri-Series in Scotland:
 102/2 (14.4 ov) beat  101 (33.2 ov) by 8 wickets
 win the tri-series.

2 July 2008 (Wednesday)
Association football:
 2008 Copa Libertadores Final, Second Leg
Fluminense  3–1 (5–5 Agg.)  LDU Quito (1–3 penalty shootout)
The Second Leg of the Copa Libertadores finals was played at a packed Estádio do Maracanã to crown the champions. Luis Bolaños of LDU Quito scored first in the 6th minute to put LDU Quito up 1–0 in the game, and 5–2 on aggregate. Fluminense answered back with a hat-trick by Thiago Neves with goals on the 12th, 28th, and 56th, minute. The score at the end of regulation was 3–1, leaving the aggregate at 5–5; extra-time was needed. After a scoreless extra-time, the game went on to a penalty shootout. LDU Quito goalkeeper José Francisco Cevallos blocked three of four penalty kicks, while his teammate put in three of four to give LDU Quito their first Copa Libertadores title.
Basketball:
 Clay Bennett and the city of Seattle announce a settlement in the city's lawsuit that attempted to keep the NBA's Seattle SuperSonics in the city. Bennett agrees to pay the city US$45 million immediately, with an additional $30 million possible if other conditions are met. The team is now free to move to Oklahoma City for the 2008–09 season, while the Sonics' name and colors will remain with Seattle, and the Sonics' history will be shared between the Oklahoma City team and any future Seattle team. (ESPN)
Cricket:
Asia Cup – Super Fours:
 309/2 (45.3 ov) beat  308/7 (50 ov) by 8 wickets (with 27 balls remaining)
Tri-Series in Scotland:
2nd Match:  211/5 (47.3 ov) beat  210/8 (50 ov) by 5 wickets (with 15 balls remaining)

1 July 2008 (Tuesday)

Cricket:
Associates Tri-Series in Scotland:
1st ODI:  402/2 (50 ov) beat  112 (28.4 ov) by 290 runs
New Zealand's 290 run win over Ireland is a new world record for the biggest margin of victory by runs. The previous world record was India's 257 run drubbing of Bermuda in the 2007 Cricket World Cup.
Bermuda in Canada:
3rd ODI:  276/9 (50 ov) beat  199/7 (50 ov) by 77 runs
 wins the 3 match series 2–1.

References

07